Huddles (originally Byte, later Clash) is an American short-form video hosting service and social network where users can create looping videos that are between 2–16 seconds long. It was created by a team led by Dom Hofmann as a successor to Vine, which Hofmann co-founded.

Initially teased as v2, it was branded as Byte in November 2018. After a three-year closed beta, it officially launched on Apple's App Store and the Google Play Store on January 24, 2020. It was acquired by Clash, another short-form video app, a year later. Both apps thus merged into a single one called Clash, which was later re-named to Huddles.

History 

Byte's predecessor, Vine, was founded in June 2012. It was acquired by Twitter in October 2012. It underwent a staggered update on iOS, Android, and Windows Phone systems throughout much of 2013. The main Vine app was shut down by Twitter in January 2017, disallowing all new videos to be uploaded. The Vine homepage was made into an archive, with users being able to view previously uploaded content. As of 2019, the archive is no longer available, though individual videos are still able to be accessed via their direct link.

Vine co-founder Dom Hofmann announced in December 2017 that he intended to launch a successor to Vine. At the time, he called it "v2". In May 2018, he posted an update that the project was being put on hold. Among other things, he said that the biggest reason for this was "financial and legal hurdles". He said that his intention was to fund the new service himself as a personal project, but the attention that the announcement generated suggested that the cost to build and run a service that was sustainable at launch would be too high. In November, he announced that the project was moving forward again with funding and a team, under the new "Byte" branding. At the time, the website invited users to sign up for updates and for content creators to join its "creator program". The partner program was shut down in August, with the byte team announcing that they "will be using this time to take everything [they've] learned and apply it toward future opportunities and programs".

Byte was officially launched to the public on the iOS and Android platforms in over 40 countries on January 24, 2020, with the tagline "creativity first". Additionally, the company has promised a program that intends to compensate creators for their work. In the media, Byte has been referred to as a direct competitor to TikTok and Likee, similar video sharing platforms popular with teens.

On January 26, 2021, it was announced that Clash, another short-form video app, would be acquiring Byte. The deal was finalized the following month, with both apps merging into a single one called Clash. After months of beta testing, Clash was publicly available on App Store on October 12, 2021. It became available for Android two months later. It is available in 41 languages.

Features 
Huddles allows users to publish videos that are between 2–16 seconds long, either captured through the app or previously recorded and stored on their devices. Similarly to other social media platforms, Huddles allows users to follow other accounts. New accounts automatically follow Huddles's official account on their service. The main home screen features a scrollable feed of content from accounts that the user is following. The platform also supports the ability to "like" and "rebyte" videos (Rebyte functionality is no longer available). In November 2020, a color customizer and a chat feature were added. The app also features a search screen with tiles for popular and latest content along with video categories like comedy, animation and others.

See also 
 Instagram
 Likee
 TikTok
 Twitter
 Vine

References

External links 
 
 Google Play
 App Store

Internet properties established in 2020
Android (operating system) software
IOS software
Social networking services